Nucula delphinodonta, or the dolphin-tooth nut shell clam, is a marine bivalve mollusc in the family Nuculidae. It can be found along the Atlantic coast of North America, ranging from Labrador to Maryland.

References

Nuculidae
Bivalves described in 1842